Where East Is East is a 1929 American silent drama film starring Lon Chaney as an animal trapper in Laos. The motion picture is Chaney's penultimate silent film and the last of his collaborations with director Tod Browning. While this film is essentially a silent film in form, with intertitles and no spoken dialogue, Metro-Goldwyn-Mayer released it with a Movietone soundtrack of effects and music.

Plot
Tiger Haynes traps wild animals for a living, and bears the scars of his dangerous occupation on his face. He cares for only one thing in life: his beloved daughter, Toyo. When he returns to the city of Vien-Tien from his latest foray in the jungle, Toyo tells him that she and Bobby Bailey, the son of an American circus owner (one of Tiger's best customers), have fallen in love and are engaged. Initially opposed to the union, Tiger gives them his blessing after Bobby protects the girl from a tiger that has gotten loose.

Tiger and Bobby take the captured animals down the river for shipment to Bobby's father. On the trip, Bobby becomes infatuated with the alluring Madame de Sylva. When Bobby introduces Tiger to her, they regard each other with intense hatred. Tiger takes Bobby off the ship to get him away from the woman. While waiting for the barge carrying the animals, he explains that Madame de Sylva is Toyo's mother. She ran away when Toyo was only a baby. Aghast, Bobby makes Tiger promise to keep the whole incident secret.

When they reach the port, Tiger is worried because Bobby and De Sylva will be sailing across the Pacific on the same ship. Bobby reassures him by instead returning with him to Toyo. However, Madame de Sylva arrives unexpectedly and is welcomed by an unsuspecting Toyo. De Sylva uses all her feminine wiles to try to lure Bobby away from her daughter. After Toyo overhears the truth in a heated argument between her parents, she tells Bobby she only wants him to be happy. That frees Bobby from the older woman's spell.

Tiger secretly opens the cage of an old gorilla who still remembers being mistreated by De Sylva long ago. It is implied that the femme fatale is killed. When Toyo and Bobby come out to see what is going on, Tiger rushes into De Sylva's room and is gravely injured. Afterward, hiding the seriousness of his wounds, Tiger watches the young couple get married by the Padre.

Cast
Lon Chaney as Tiger Haynes
Lupe Vélez as Toyo Haynes
Estelle Taylor as Madame de Sylva
Lloyd Hughes as Bobby Bailey
Louis Stern as Padre, Father Angelo
Mrs. Wong Wing as Ming, the woman who raised Toyo
Willie Fung as Servant (uncredited)
Duke Kahanamoku as Wild Animal Trapper (uncredited)
Mademoiselle Kithnou as de Sylva's Maid, who tries to help Tiger several times (uncredited)
Richard Neill as Rangho the Gorilla (uncredited)

References

External links

Still #1 and #2 at gettyimages.com

1929 films
1929 romantic drama films
American romantic drama films
American silent feature films
American black-and-white films
Films directed by Tod Browning
Films produced by Irving Thalberg
Transitional sound films
Metro-Goldwyn-Mayer films
1920s American films
Silent romantic drama films
Silent American drama films
Films with screenplays by Richard Schayer
Films set in Laos